Asror Aliqulov (born 12 September 1978) is an Uzbekistani footballer playing in the position of defender. He currently plays for Shurtan.

Career
He started his playing career in 1995, playing for Mash'al Mubarek. After completing 3 seasons for Mash'al he moved to Nasaf Qarshi. From 1997 to 2002 he played for Pakhtakor.

International
He was a member of the national team, playing from 1999 to 2008 and has been capped 63 times.

Honours

Club
Pakhtakor
 Uzbek League (5): 2003, 2004, 2005, 2006, 2007
 Uzbek Cup (5): 2003, 2004, 2005, 2006, 2007
 AFC Champions League semifinal (2): 2002/2003, 2004
 CIS Cup: 2007

National team
 Merdeka Tournament winner: 2001

References

External links

Player profile at doha-2006.com

1978 births
Living people
Association football defenders
Uzbekistani footballers
Uzbekistan international footballers
2004 AFC Asian Cup players
2007 AFC Asian Cup players
FK Mash'al Mubarek players
FC Nasaf players
FC Shurtan Guzar players
Pakhtakor Tashkent FK players
FK Dinamo Samarqand players
Footballers at the 2002 Asian Games
Footballers at the 2006 Asian Games
Asian Games competitors for Uzbekistan
FC Shurtan Guzar managers